Nicolas Kasanda wa Mikalay (7 July 1939 – 22 September 1985), popularly known as Docteur Nico, was a guitarist, composer and one of the pioneers of Congolese music. He was born in Mikalayi in the Belgian Congo. He graduated in 1957 as a technical teacher, but inspired by his musical family, he took up the guitar and in time became a virtuoso soloist.

Musical career 
At the age of 14, Kasanda started playing with the group Grand Kalle et l'African Jazz, led by Joseph "Grand Kalle" Kabasele. He became an influential guitarist (Jimi Hendrix  visited him while on tour in Paris), and the originator of the ubiquitous Congolese finger-picked guitar style, acquiring the nickname "Dr. Nico". African Jazz split up in 1963 when he and singer Tabu Ley Rochereau left to form L'Orchestra African Fiesta, which became one of the most popular bands in Africa.

In 1970 Kasanda wrote an arrangement of the Luba folk song Kamulangu, recorded it with his band, Orchestre African Fiesta Sukisa, and released it to much success in Kinshasa.

He withdrew from the music scene in the mid 1970s following the collapse of his Belgian record label, and made a few final recordings in Togo, not long before he died in a hospital in Brussels, Belgium in 1985.

Discography

Contributing artist
 The Rough Guide to Congo Gold (2008, World Music Network)

References

Works cited

Further reading
Rumba on the River: A History of the Popular Music of the Two Congos (1999). Gary Stewart –

External links
25 Years Since He Disappeared (Died) Posted on 21 September 2010 (Translated from the Original French Language)
Discography of Docteur Nico
 Discography and biographical details in French and English

1939 births
1985 deaths
People from Kasaï-Central
Fingerstyle guitarists
Democratic Republic of the Congo guitarists
Soukous musicians
20th-century guitarists